COTECMAR (Corporación de Ciencia y Tecnología para el Desarrollo de la Industria Naval Marítima y Fluvial) is a Colombian state-owned defense, shipbuilder, and engineering company that provides services to the Ministry of National Defense of Colombia and other domestic and international costumers. It is the largest and most important shipbuilding and repair company in Colombia, with facilities in Mamonal and Bocagrande in Cartagena de Indias.

History

Established in 1969 as CONASTIL,

In September 2022, COTECTMAR and the Damen Group signed an agreement to co-develop and produce five new frigates for the Colombian Navy based on the Sigma-class design.

Products

Warships 

 Frigates (Sigma-class design)
 Patrol boats (OPV-93, LPR-40)
 Landing Craft Utility (Golfo de Tribuga-class landing craft)

Civilian

Notable clients

  Brazil
 , 
 LPR-40 riverine patrol boats
  Colombia

OPV-80-class offshore patrol vessel
Colombian Naval Infantry

Maintenance work for Libertador Juan Rafael Mora Porras
 
Golfo de Tribuga-class landing craft
 
Golfo de Tribuga-class landing craft
SAFE BOATS 35MMI Multi Misión Interceptor
  Jamaica
  Netherlands
 
 Maintenance work for HNLMS Pelikaan (A804)

See also
Indumil

References

External links
 

Shipbuilding companies of Colombia
Defence companies of Colombia
Government-owned companies of Colombia
Manufacturing companies established in 2000
Transport in Colombia
Colombian companies established in 2000
Companies based in Bogotá